Charlie Rose (born 1942) is an American news personality.

Charles, Chuck, or Charlie Rose may also refer to:

 Charlie Rose (talk show), an American television interview show, for which Charlie Rose served as executive producer, executive editor, and host until it was cancelled in November 2017.

People

In politics
 Charlie Rose (mayor) (1913–1989), mayor of Campbell, California
 Charles A. Rose (1939–2022), American politician, mayor of Chattanooga, Tennessee (1975–1983)
 Charlie Rose (politician) (1939–2012), Democratic United States Congressman from North Carolina, 1973–1997
 Sir Charles Rose, 1st Baronet (1847–1913), British-Canadian businessman, race horse breeder, yachtsman and Liberal politician

In sports
 Charlie Rose (footballer) (1872–1949), English footballer
 Charles Rose (Olympic athlete) (1873–1957), American tug of war athlete who competed in the 1904 Summer Olympics
 Chuck Rose (1885–1961) U.S. baseball player

Other people
 Charles Rose (bishop) (died 1791), Anglican clergyman
 Sir Charles Rose, 1st Baronet (1847–1913), British-Canadian businessman, race horse breeder, yachtsman and Liberal politician
 Charles Henry Rose (1873–1948), sheriff of Honolulu
 Charles Rose (architect) (born 1960), American architect based out of Massachusetts

Other uses
 Pete Rose (born 1941) nicknamed "Charlie Hustle", U.S. baseball player

See also
 Rose Charlie (born 1930) U.S. Amerindian leader
 Charles Roser (1864–1937) U.S. businessman
 Carl Rose (disambiguation)
 Karl Rose (disambiguation)
 Rose (disambiguation)

Rose, Charlie